Big bucks may refer to:

A large amount of money
Big Bucks Trivia, a game
Big Buck Hunter, another game
Big Buck's, National Hunt racehorse